William Wilson (18 June 1808–14 January 1888) was a Scottish minister of the Free Church of Scotland who served as Moderator of the General Assembly in 1866/67.

Life
He was born in Westruther on 18 June 1808. He studied at the University of Edinburgh, and befriended John Laird. They both then studied theology at Divinity Hall under Rev Dr Thomas Chalmers, graduating with an MA. Together with Robert McCheyne, Alexander Somerville, Horatius Bonar and Andrew Bonar they founded the Exegetical Society.

He was licensed to preach by the Church of Scotland and Presbytery of Lauder in 1833 but failed to find a patron, a then essential requirement and one of the main issues in the later establishment of the Free Church. While he awaited a patron he did parochial mission work south of the River Clyde in Glasgow. He also became editor of the Scottish Guardian: a twice weekly evangelical newspaper, in this period.

In 1837 he finally found a patron and was ordained at Carmyllie a village east of Dundee. This post was relatively short-lived as he left the Church of Scotland in the Disruption of 1843 and joined the Free Church. Unfortunately insufficient parishioners left with him and they were unable to establish a new church in the parish. Instead he and those who left worshipped in barns or the fields of sympathetic farmers. However, also losing his manse, he lived six miles away from the parish. In 1845 a church and manse were finally built at Carmyllie. However, Wilson then left the parish in 1848 to serve the Mariners Church in Dundee, a former Secessionist Church. Ownership issues forced the Free Church of Scotland to sell the church in 1850 and establish their own church. This was finished in 1852 and named St Paul's Free Church. It stood on the Nethergate and had a congregation of 440.

Wilson did much mission work and in 1863 was appointed Convenor of the Home Mission Committee for the Free Church, holding the post for ten years. In 1866 he was elected Moderator of the General Assembly. From 1888 he stepped down as the full-time minister of St Paul's and was replaced by his assistant, Richard Waterston, replaced in turn by Rev William Patrick during Wilson's life.

For his last 30 years he lived at 18 Afton Place in Dundee.

In 1877 the University of Edinburgh awarded him an honorary doctorate (DD).

In November 1887 he resigned all roles due to ill-health, and quickly became bed-ridden.

He died on 14 January 1888. He is buried in the Western Cemetery, Dundee.

Publications
Statement of  the  Scriptural  Argument  against Patronage  (Edinburgh,  1842)
The  Duty  of Bringing  Helpless  Souls  to  Jesus  (Dundee, 1850)
The  Kingdom  of  Our  Lord  Jesus Christ  (Edinburgh,  1859)
The  Heavenward  Path  (Edinburgh,  1862)
Christ setting  His  Face  towards  Jerusalem (Dundee,  1878)
Memorials  of  Robert Smith  Candlish,  D.D.  (Edinburgh,  1880)
The  Presence  of  Christ  in  the  Meetings  of the  Office-Bearers  of  His  Church
Free Church  Principles  [Chalmers  Lecture] (1887)
Christ's  Gift  to  the  Church  and  His Authority  (1858).
He  edited  Daniel  Defoe's Memoirs  of  the  Church  of  Scotland  (Perth, 1844)  and  Stirling's  Naphtali  (Perth,  1845)
Sermons  XXII.,  CXXVI. ; Lecture  XIX. (Free  Church  Pulpit,  i.,  ii.)
Biography of  David  Welsh,  D.D.  (Disruption Worthies,  Edinburgh,  1876)
Account  of the  Parish  (New  Statistical  Account  Scotland,  xi.).

Bibliography
Eminent  Arbroathians,  345-58
The  Border  Almanac  (1889)
Annals  of  the Disruption,  179,  263,  762
Smith's  Scottish Clergy,  iii.,  351

Family
He  married  13  January  1840, Eliza  Smith  (died  25  February  1860),  daughter of  Alexander  White  of  Drimmietermont, Forfar,  and  Helen  Farquhar,  and  had  issue —
Helen  Farquhar,  born  20  August  1841, died  17  February  1890
Agnes  Martin,  born 4  July  1843  (married  Irvine  Drimmie)
Andrew  James,  born  10  April  1845,  died at  Coconada,  Madras,  18  August  1881
Eliza  Jane,  born  19  June  1847
Ann Isabella,  born  19  January  1849  (married William  Wilson)
Mary  Louisa,  born  17 December  1850,  died  29  October  1898
Alexander White,  born  1  October  1853,  died  in  India 15  July  1875
William,  born  14  April 1855,  died  June  1918.

Artistic recognition

His portrait by James Michael Brown is held by Dundee Art Gallery.

References

Sources

19th-century Ministers of the Free Church of Scotland
1808 births
1888 deaths
People from the Scottish Borders